Mabrouk el Mechri (born 18 September 1976) is a French director, screenwriter, and actor.

Biography
El Mechri was born in Versailles near Paris, France. He has directed a number of films. After his three shorts Mounir et Anita, Generation Cutter, and Concours de circonstance, he directed his first long feature Virgil in 2005 about the life of a boxer, followed by a comedy entitled Stand Up!. His 2008 movie entitled JCVD about Jean-Claude Van Damme and featuring him as the actor garnered Mabrouk El Mechri critical acclaim. The film, a comedy drama and at certain times biographical of Van Damme was screened at the Cannes Film Festival, 2008 Rome Film Festival (L'Altro Cinema), and the 2008 Toronto International Film Festival (Midnight Madness). 

He is now working on his new movie Sage femme (2008) featuring Vanessa Paradis. He was married to actress Audrey Dana, with whom he had a child in 2008. Until 2014 he was in a relationship with Virginie Efira with whom he had a child, Ali born on 24 May 2013 in Paris.

Filmography 
Director
Mounir et Anita (1998)
Generation Cutter (2000)
Concours de circonstances (2003)
Virgil (2005)
Stand Up! (2006)
JCVD (2008)
The Cold Light of Day (2012)

Screenwriter
Mounir et Anita (1998)
Generation Cutter (2000)
Concours de circonstances (2003)
Virgil (2005)
JCVD (2008)

Actor
 (2007) directed by Gilles Paquet-Brenner in the role of Rachid

Cinematographer
Stand Up! (2006)

Composer
Mounir et Anita (1998)

References

External links

1976 births
Living people
French film directors
French people of Algerian descent
Tunisian screenwriters